Floris van den Berg (born 4 February 1973) is a Dutch philosopher, mostly known for his atheism campaign in the Netherlands.

Activities 
Van den Berg was raised in a liberal Catholic home, but became an atheist activist as an adult.

Following the initiative of Ariane Sherine and Richard Dawkins for the Atheist Bus Campaign in the United Kingdom, that was taken up in several other European countries, Floris van den Berg announced the intention to launch a similar campaign in the Netherlands on 12 January 2009. Kees van der Staaij of the ultraconservative Protestant Reformed Political Party (SGP) asked parliamentary questions about the matter to Secretary of State of Transport Tineke Huizinga, and discussed the topic with Van den Berg on 28 January in Nova. However, the bus campaign was abandoned, because the major bus companies Connexxion, Arriva and Veolia do not allow messages of a political or religious nature.

In January 2017, Floris participated in the EO television series Rot op met je religie ("To Hell With Your Religion"), in which he lives together with two Christians, a Muslim, a Jew and a fellow atheist for two weeks. They go on a journey throughout the country to discover, discuss and critique religious ideas and rituals.

Floris is a vegan and an advocate of sentientism.

Works 
 Geleefde brieven / Deel I: Prometheus (2009). .
 Hoe komen we van religie af? (2009). .
 Filosofie voor een betere wereld (2009). .
  Harming others : universal subjectivism and the expanding moral circle, Dissertation, Leiden University 2011 (dissertation advisor Prof. dr. P. B. Cliteur).
 Geleefde brieven / Deel III: Ikaros (2012). .
 Philosophy for a Better World, Prometheus Books, (2013). .
 De vrolijke veganist – Ethiek in een veranderende wereld (2013). .
 Utopische Meditaties. Gedichten & gedachten (2014). 
 Beter Weten (2015). .
 De vrolijke feminist  (2016). .

References

External links 

 Floris van den Berg – Auteurs – Houtekiet
 Atheism Campaign

1973 births
Living people
21st-century Dutch philosophers
Dutch atheists
Dutch skeptics
Philosophers of religion
People from Naarden
Dutch former Christians
Former Roman Catholics
Sentientists